Takahiko (written: 崇彦, 孝彦, 貴彦, 隆彦 or 恭彦) is a masculine Japanese given name. Notable people with the name include:

, Japanese film director
, Japanese figure skater
, Japanese psychologist
, Japanese baseball player
, Japanese sumo wrestler
, Japanese footballer
, Japanese physicist

Japanese masculine given names